Velleman is a surname. Notable people with the surname include:

CJ Velleman, South African rugby union player
J. David Velleman (born 1952), American philosopher
Michel Velleman (1895–1943), Dutch magician
Paul F. Velleman (born 1949), American professor of statistics